The Lingqu is a canal in Xing'an County, near Guilin, in the northwestern corner of Guangxi, China. It connects  the Xiang River (which flows north into the Yangtze) with the Li River (which flows south into the Gui River and Xijiang), and thus is part of a historical waterway between the Yangtze and the Pearl River Delta.  It was the first canal in the world to connect two river valleys and enabled boats to travel  from Beijing to Hong Kong.

History
In 214 BC, Qin Shi Huang, the First Emperor of the Qin dynasty (221–206 BC), ordered the construction of a canal connecting the Xiang and the Li rivers, in order to attack the Baiyue tribes in the south. The architect who designed the canal was Shi Lu. It is the oldest contour canal in the world, receiving its water from the Xiang. Its length reaches 36.4 km and it was fitted with thirty-seven flash locks by 825 AD and there is a clear description of pound locks in the twelfth century, which were probably installed in the tenth or eleventh century. Its design also served water conservation by diverting up to a third of the flow of the Xiang to the Li.

The canal has been placed on the UNESCO World Heritage Sites tentative list.

See also
 History of canals in China
 Grand Canal of China
 Dujiangyan
 Zhengguo Canal

References

Citations

Bibliography
Day, Lance and McNeil, Ian . (1996). Biographical Dictionary of the History of Technology. New York: Routledge. .

Canals in China
Chinese inventions 
Geography of Guilin
Xing'an County
Major National Historical and Cultural Sites in Guangxi
Qin (state)
Transport in Guangxi
Qin dynasty architecture